Orange is a 2010 Indian Telugu-language romantic comedy drama film written and directed by Bhaskar. The film stars Ram Charan, Genelia D'Souza, and Shazahn Padamsee, while Prabhu and Prakash Raj play supporting roles. The film, whose music was composed by Harris Jayaraj and was released on 26 November 2010. The film was a box office failure upon release, but over time became a cult film. It was dubbed and released in Tamil as  Ramcharan in 2011.

Plot 
In Sydney, an angry Ram who just broke up with his girlfriend Janaki "Jaanu", narrates the story of his love life to a police officer, Abhishek Verma as he defaces a graffiti of his lover while Jaanu's father listens.

Ram is an youngster who does graffiti and does not believe in everlasting love. He has gone through nine loves in his life and thinks that love between two people eventually dies out. As a person with strong morals, he is honest and wants to love life and live with an open mind, open thought and open action with his lover. Jaanu studies in the same college as Ram. He falls in love with her at first sight and goes onto wooing her. She eventually ends up falling for him but wants him to promise to love her forever. Ram, of course, nonchalantly dismisses this and explains how he cannot love her forever. This leads to a clash of their ideologies. Ram shows Jaanu how true love cannot stay forever, while Jaanu shows him examples of everlasting love, like her friends and her parents. However, he makes it clear that love between two people is never the same as it first is.

Abhishek makes Ram tell him why he feels like this, and Ram explains another love in his life: Roopa. He falls in love with her as she visits Hyderabad when he is on a foreign exchange project. He follows her to Mumbai, and they both fall in love. However, as time passes, the couple faces problems, and Ram feels himself lying more and more just to make Rooba happy. Unable to take it anymore, he tells her that he cannot continue loving her if he has to lie and sacrifice so much for her. They break up, and through the experience, Ram becomes the man he is. Ram tries wooing Jaanu once again but soon backs off knowing her desire for a commitment and a life partner. In the end, the story again focuses on the present where Ram is shown defacing Jaanu's face in his graffiti. Abhishek also realizes that Ram is right in his own way. Ram reveals that Jaanu asked him to give up graffiti and get into a job as a painting teacher. Initially, Ram is reluctant but then even he realizes that he loves himself more than he loves his partner so he should start loving his partner more and even learns that sacrifices are a very integral part of a relationship. Hence he sacrifices graffiti and decides to propose to Jaanu again, trying to be committed this time.

Cast 

 Ram Charan as Ram
 Genelia as Janaki "Jaanu"
 Shazahn A. Padamsee as Rooba
 Prabhu as Jaanu's father
 Prakash Raj as Abhishek Verma
 Brahmanandam as Puppy
 Srinivas Avasarala as Pushkar
 Manjula as Ram's sister
 Sanjay Swaroop as Ram's brother-in-law
 Pavitra Lokesh as Jaanu's mother
 Vennela Kishore as Ram's friend
 Praneeth as Ram's friend
 Sanchita as Soni, Jaanu's friend
 Kalpika Ganesh as Jaanu's friend
 Sameer as Jaanu's uncle
 Phanikanth Rampalli as Mahesh
 Siddharth as Santosh
 Indraneil Varma as Rajesh
 Nyra Banerjee as Madhu, Ram's ex-girlfriend (guest appearance)
 Gayatri Rao as Maya, Ram's friend's girlfriend (guest appearance)
 Pooja as Meenakshi, Ram's childhood teacher (guest appearance)
 Nagendra Babu (uncredited) as Ram's neighbor

Production 
Ram Charan wanted to do a love story after Magadheera (2009) and contacted Bhaskar since he liked Bommarillu (2006). Genelia D'Souza was cast in the film, which was to be produced by Ram Charan's uncle Nagendra Babu. Kajal Aggarwal was initially considered to play another heroine but she was later replaced by Shazahn Padamsee, who made her Telugu debut with this film. Genelia D'Souza's character was similar to her bubbly Hasini role in Bommarillu (2006). Ram Charan and Genelia D'Souza plays Indian students studying in Australia. The film was shot in Melbourne and Sydney, Australia; Mumbai, India; and Malaysia. The film is the largest Indian budget film that was mostly shot in Australia. Over two hundred and fifty people from Australia were a part of the cast and crew.

Soundtrack 

Harris Jayaraj composed the soundtrack and background score, in his first collaboration with Ram Charan and Bhaskar. The album consists of six tracks with Vanamali, Ramajogayya Sastry, Surrender Krishna, Kedarnath Parimi penning the lyrics. Karunya, Karthik, Naresh Iyer, Vijay Prakash, Benny Dayal, Shail Hada, Chinmayi performed the vocals. The rights for the soundtrack album were purchased by Aditya Music record label. The audio was launched on 25 October 2010 at Shilpakala Vedika in Hyderabad. The audio went on to receive highly positive reviews from critics and audience and was nominated at major award ceremonies for Best Music Direction including Filmfare Awards South.

Awards and nominations

Reception 
Jeevi of Idlebrain.com gave the film a rating of 3.25 out of 5 and opined that "Orange is an honest film with a nice story idea despite inconsistencies and a few dull moments". Serish Nanisetti of The Hindu opined that "Orange is a luridly vivid non-linear narrative with the smarts in all the right places" and noted that "Ambiguity and love may not go together in Indian film industry, but Baskar manages to tell the story and keep the attention of the audience". Sify rated the film 2.75 out of 5 and noted that "Orange maybe the symbol of love but we hardly find any love in the movie. Less love, more arguments – that's about it". Radhika Rajamani of Rediff.com gave the film a rating of  out of five stars and wrote that "It becomes a bit monotonous to hear the lines on love over and over again. The confusion over the 'love' issue slows down the proceedings". Deepa Garimella of Full Hyderabad said that "On the whole, the film tends to look confused and shaky in its fundamentals, and Bhaskar could have chosen a more streamlined way of telling his story, but for what it's worth, Orange seems a decent step out of the clutter".

Box office 
The film was a box office failure despite the successful soundtrack. However, it has been people's favourite much later to its theatrical run and even the critics admit it's a film that's ahead of its time.

Dropped remake
In November 2009, before the film's release, Jeyam Ravi, a close friend of Bhaskar under whom he worked under as an assistant director, expressed interest in remaking the film in Tamil for his film with Vijay.

References

External links 

2010 films
2010 romantic comedy films
2010s Telugu-language films
Films scored by Harris Jayaraj
Films shot in Australia
Films shot in Malaysia
Films shot in Mumbai
Indian romantic comedy films
Films set in Mumbai
Films set in Sydney